Soshimsa Zen Center ( Hangul: 소심사 Hanja: 少心寺) is a U.S. Buddhist organization in New Jersey, affiliated with the Taego Order of Korean Seon.

History

The organization was founded in May 2009, and is currently a 501(c)3 non profit charitable organization. Since 1975, when founder Ven. Il-Cho Dosanim (일초 도사님) came to United States, his mission has been to develop a temple in order to foster the teachings of Buddhism. Today, three of Ven. Il-Cho's disciples are the pillars that support So Shim Sa. Ven. Duhk-Song Sunim (덕성 스님)  has studied under Ven. Il-Cho for over three decades and serves as the director of the center's outreach program, 1000 Hands. Elected as Director of Wellness Programs, and with a Doctorate in Clinical Psychology, Ven. Mooh-Sang Sunim (무상 스님) coordinates education and wellness programs offered at So Shim Sa. A disciple of Ven. Il-Cho since 1997 and ordained as a Buddhist monk in 2003, Ven. Myong-Ahn Sunim (명안 스님) serves as the appointed Abbot.

Soshimsa Buddhist Fellowship

Fellowship Chapters
Soshimsa Buddhist Fellowship opened its first chapter as a campus chaplaincy  at Rutgers University in September 2010. (Currently on pause). Ven. Myong-Ahn serves as the Chapter President.

References

External links

Buddhist temples in New Jersey
Zen centers in the United States
Zen Buddhist monasteries
Korean-American culture in New Jersey
2009 establishments in New Jersey